Yu Wensheng (born November 11, 1967) is a Chinese human rights lawyer based in Beijing. He is known for criticizing the Chinese Communist Party and taking up politically sensitive cases against the government.

Arrest 

In 2014, Yu was detained due to his vocal support for Hong Kong's yellow umbrella movement. In 2017, Chinese judicial authorities refused the passing of Yu's annual bar license review, which led to Yu's forced resignation from the Beijing Daoheng Law Firm. This inhibited Yu's ability to practice law, since one must be employed by an established law firm to do so. Yu then sought to establish his own law firm, whose application for registration was denied in January 2018. Subsequently, Yu's legal license was revoked on account of his not being employed by any law firm for six months.

On 18 January 2018, Yu published an open letter calling for reforms such as the holding of fair elections, advocating for an oversight system of the Chinese Communist Party, etc. The next day, Yu was arrested while walking his 13 year-old son to school on suspicion of "picking quarrels and provoking troubles". Yu was afterwards detained for a period of more than two years, during which he was barred from meeting his family and lawyers. In April 2019, the UN working group on arbitrary detentions issued a statement calling for Yu's release.

Yu's wife, Xu Yan, commented that Yu's "proposal to amend the constitution and promote a reform in the political system [in China] was the main reason for his arrest [...] Now, human rights defenders don't dare to speak up any longer."

However, Shanghai-based news website The Paper believes otherwise. According to its report published on 23 January 2018, Yu was said to have assaulted two police officers and resisted the rest. The report was widely circulated on news portals and social media in China, while Yu's family and friends claimed that it was an effort to discredit Yu.

Four-year sentence
In May 2019, Yu was secretly tried without the knowledge of his family. He was secretly sentenced on the charge of "inciting subversion of state power" in June 2020. The Xuzhou city intermediate people’s court furthermore deprived Yu of his political rights for a period of three years, during which he would be barred from taking public positions, speaking publicly and publishing.

Yu then appealed his sentence, which was rejected by the Jiangsu Provincial People’s High Court. According to Hong Kong news media RTHK, The People's High Court ruled on the grounds that Yu had "spread rumors and attempted to subvert state power by trying to overthrow the country’s socialist regime".

In response to Yu's sentence, Nicholas Bequelin, director of Amnesty International’s Asia-Pacific, commented that Yu’s sentencing is “nothing but political persecution dressed up as legal process [...] The secret sentencing of yet another human rights lawyer marks a new low for what is left of the rule of law in China".

On January 19, 2020, the European Union denounced the court’s decision and called for Yu's immediate release.

Awards

The Franco-German Prize for Human Rights and the Rule of Law
While in detention, Yu won the Franco-German Prize for Human Rights and the Rule of Law for 2018, which was granted by the French and German ambassadors to Beijing and received by Yu's wife, Xu Yan, on Yu's behalf.

The Martin Ennals Award

On 11 February 2021, Yu won the Martin Ennals Award, the world's most prestigious human rights award, for his work to defend human rights in China despite many obstacles. The Martin Ennals award has been given out annually since 1994, and the winner is selected by a jury of 10 international human rights organizations, including Human Rights Watch and Amnesty International.

Isabel De Sola, Martin Ennals Award's spokeswoman, said about the 2021 award candidates: "Authoritarian states such as these crack down on human rights defenders, they track them and survey them, they harass their families, they troll and discredit them online, they shut down the businesses or organisations they start, and in some cases they put defenders in jail".

Philippe Currat, president of the board of the Martin Ennals Foundation that administers the award, said: "On the eve of the Chinese New Year, we hope this recognition of Yu Wensheng’s work will shine a light on his achievements and help him regain the freedom he has lost”.

Phil Lynch, executive director of the International Service for Human Rights, said the award demonstrated that "unjustly imprisoning Yu [...] will not go ignored".

References 

1967 births
Living people
Amnesty International prisoners of conscience held by China
Peking University alumni
Chinese torture victims
Chinese human rights activists